Darlington Woods is an unincorporated community in Franklin Township, Montgomery County, in the U.S. state of Indiana.

History
Darlington Woods was a popular hunting spot for residents of the town of Darlington. Deer, pheasant, quail, and rabbits are all plentiful in the area. The Darlington Covered Bridge resides on the southern edge of the wood and was built in 1868.

Geography

References

Unincorporated communities in Montgomery County, Indiana
Unincorporated communities in Indiana